Beyond Witch Mountain is a 1982 American made-for-television science fiction-fantasy film and a sequel to Escape to Witch Mountain (1975) and is the third installment in the Witch Mountain franchise. While most parts were recast, including Tia and Tony, Eddie Albert returned to play Jason O'Day from the original 1975 movie.  

Beyond Witch Mountain was broadcast on CBS as an episode of Walt Disney on February 20, 1982.

While the siblings Tia and Tony are teenagers in the 1978 film Return from Witch Mountain, the characters in Beyond Witch Mountain are younger, closer in age to their depiction in the original film.

Plot 
Tia and Tony follow their Uncle Bené as he leaves the Witch Mountain colony. As they catch up to him in the woods, Deranian and Foreman, henchmen of billionaire Aristotle Bolt, shoot tranquilizer darts toward the trio in an attempt to capture the children. Bené reverses the darts in mid-air, and one strikes Foreman as Deranian runs from the scene.
Tia and Tony learn that Bené has left the colony in search of his long-lost grandson. In a vision, Bené discovered that his grandson, Gregory, also a survivor from their lost world, used his telekinetic powers to move a log across a river to save drowning children. Bené first encourages Tia and Tony to return to the safety of Witch Mountain, but they insist that they can help and Bené concedes. Tia, Tony and Bené set up camp in the woods for the night, and they begin to visualize a cabin, which they draw in the dirt with a stick. Bené finally reveals to the children that his time on Earth has come to an end. As he passes away and his body evaporates, he tells the children to go to the cabin to seek help in finding Gregory.

The next morning, Tia ascertains that the cabin belonged to Jason O’Day. They reunite with Jason, who reluctantly agrees to help them in finding Gregory and bringing him home to Witch Mountain, after Tony reveals that Bolt is again pursuing them. The children are also reunited with Winkie, Tia's black cat, who she entrusted to Jason at the end of Escape.

Meanwhile, Bolt, now aware that the children have left their secret colony, sends Deranian to bring Jason to him, in an attempt to lure the children to Bolt. When Jason and the children are briefly separated on a shopping trip, Jason is held up at gunpoint by Deranian and Foreman and forced to drive to Bolt's estate. Winkie leaps out of the window of Jason's camper, and telepathically informs Tia of Jason's plight.

Jason, meanwhile, is drugged by Bolt in an attempt to gain information about the children, and Jason inadvertently reveals that he has been in contact with the children. The children hitchhike their way to Bolt's estate to rescue Jason. Using their telekinetic powers, they cause a commotion inside the home, which allows them the opportunity to escape with Jason. The trio successfully escapes from Bolt in time to retrieve Gregory from a hospital, where he has been under observation. Tia and Tony teach Gregory about their people, and the colony of Witch Mountain, and Gregory happily agrees to be returned to his people, having already had visions of his impeding rescue.

Jason brings Tia, Tony and Gregory to the woods near Witch Mountain. The children begin walking towards the colony, but Tony and Tia decide that they should seek out other survivors from their world, and bring them home to Witch Mountain. As Gregory continues on to Witch Mountain, Tia and Tony return to Jason's camper, and Jason agrees to help them in their efforts to retrieve other survivors.

Cast 
 Eddie Albert as Jason O'Day
 Tracey Gold as Tia
 Andy Freeman as Tony
 Efrem Zimbalist Jr. as Bolt
 J.D. Cannon as Deranian
 Noah Beery Jr. as Uncle Bené
 Stephanie Blackmore as Dr. Adrian Molina
 Peter Hobbs as Dr. Peter Morton
 Gene Dynarski as Lawrence
 William H. Bassett as Lowell Roberts
 James Luisi as Foreman
 Hettie Lynne Hurtes as Reporter
 Lola Mason as Lady Driver
 Eric Aved as Gregory
 Kirk Cameron as Boy

References

External links 
 

1982 television films
1982 films
1982 American television episodes
American children's films
American science fiction films
Films scored by George Duning
Films directed by Robert Day
Television pilots not picked up as a series
Television sequel films
Witch Mountain films
Disney television films
1980s science fiction films
Walt Disney anthology television series episodes
Films about telekinesis
Witch Mountain (franchise)
1980s American films